Samira Nawa Amini (born 30 March 1988 in Aalborg) is a Danish politician, who is a member of the Folketing for the Social Liberal Party. She was elected into parliament at the 2019 Danish general election.

Background
Amini's parents are from Afghanistan, and fled to Denmark to escape the war in 1986. She and her family lived in Pakistan for a time. Amini is married and has two children.

Education 
Amini was a student of economics at the University of Copenhagen from 2007-2014. She graduated with a Master of Science in Economics (Cand. Polit.) in 2014.

Political career
Amini first ran for parliament in the 2015 Danish general election where she received 1,790 personal votes. This was not enough for a seat in parliament, although she was elected as a substitute member. She was not called upon during the 2015-2019 term though. In the 2019 election she received 4,657 votes, securing her a seat in the Folketing.

External links 
 Biography on the website of the Danish Parliament (Folketinget)

References 

Living people
1988 births
Politicians from Aalborg
21st-century Danish women politicians
Women members of the Folketing
Danish Social Liberal Party politicians
Members of the Folketing 2019–2022
Members of the Folketing 2022–2026
University of Copenhagen alumni
Danish people of Afghan descent